The Themis programme is a European Space Agency programme, that is taking the first steps towards a European government-funded demonstration flights of a prototype reusable rocket first stage. The prototype rocket will also be called Themis, with flights slated to begin as early as 2023.

Context 
Themis is expected to provide valuable information on the economic value of reusability for the European government space program and develop technologies for potential use on future European launch vehicles.

Themis will be powered by the ESA's Prometheus rocket engine.

Two possible landing sites have been mentioned in discussions surrounding the project:
 The former Diamant launch complex, which will be used for the flight testing phase;
 The Ariane 5 launch complex, which will become available after the transition from the Ariane 5 to the next-generation Ariane 6.

The estimated program timeline, is as follows:
 2020: Basic stage testing, composed of tank filling and ground support equipment tests.
 2021: Prometheus engine testing
 2022: Low-altitude hop tests (short flights up from and down to the launch site)
 2023: Initial flight test
 2023–2024: Loop tests (repeated flights of the reusable demonstration vehicle)
 2025: Full flight envelope test

Suborbital flight tests are slated to begin as early as 2023 at Europe's Spaceport in Kourou, French Guiana.

Eventually, lessons learned with Themis' development will pave the way for developing the European reusable launcher Ariane Next, which should first fly in the 2030s.

History 
 On 15 December 2020, ESA signed a contract worth €33 million with prime contractor ArianeGroup in France for the ‘Themis Initial Phase’. This first phase of the Themis involves development of the flight vehicle technologies, and test bench and static fire demonstrations at Vernon in France. It also includes the preparation of the ground segment at the Esrange Space Center in Kiruna, Sweden, for the first hop tests and any associated flight vehicle modifications.

See also 
 Future Launchers Preparatory Programme
 CALLISTO
 Prometheus (rocket engine)
 Ariane Next
 SpaceX reusable launch system development program
 Miura 5

References

External links 
ESA Themis website

Space programs
European space programmes
Spaceflight technology
Reusable launch systems
Partially reusable space launch vehicles
Space launch vehicles of Europe